Stylianos "Stelios" Kokovas (born 6 July 2001) is a Greek professional footballer who plays as a centre-back for Karviná.

Club career
Kokovas made his professional debut for VfL Bochum in the 2. Bundesliga on 30 March 2019, starting in the home match against Hamburger SV, which finished as a 0–0 draw.

International career
Kokovas was called up to the Greece national under-18 team in December 2018, appearing in a friendly match against Italy, which finished as a 4–1 away loss.

References

External links
 
 
 Profile at kicker.de

2001 births
Living people
Footballers from Larissa
Greek footballers
Greek expatriate footballers
Greece youth international footballers
Association football central defenders
VfL Bochum players
MFK Karviná players
FK Pohronie players
2. Bundesliga players
Czech First League players
Slovak Super Liga players
Expatriate footballers in Germany
Greek expatriate sportspeople in Germany
Expatriate footballers in the Czech Republic
Greek expatriate sportspeople in the Czech Republic
Expatriate footballers in Slovakia
Greek expatriate sportspeople in Slovakia